Marian Jankowski (8 December 1931 – 9 March 2017) was a Polish weightlifter. He competed in the men's bantamweight event at the 1960 Summer Olympics.

References

1931 births
2017 deaths
Polish male weightlifters
Olympic weightlifters of Poland
Weightlifters at the 1960 Summer Olympics
People from Kościan County